Hayk Square ( Hayki Hraparak), is the large central town square in Vanadzor, Armenia. It is intersected by the Tigran Mets Avenue from the southeast the northwest, and the Movses Khorenatsi Street from the northeast.

The square was opened during the 1950s, based on the original plan designed by architects Baghdasar Arzoumanian and Hovhannes Margarian. During the Soviet period, the square was known as Kirov Square, named after the Bolshevik leader Sergey Kirov. Kirov's statue was standing at the centre of the square until the independence of Armenia. It is envisaged to erect the statues of Hayk Nahapet and Tigranes the Great at the square.

Description
Hayk square is decorated with several fountains at its central part. It is surrounded with notable buildings:
The Lori Province administration building, occupying the southern part
The Vanadzor City Hall - designed by Baghdasar Arzoumanian - occupying the eastern part
Gugark Hotel - designed by Baghdasar Arzoumanian-, occupying the western part

Gallery

References
 

Buildings and structures in Vanadzor
Squares in Armenia